Oscar George Threlkeld (born 15 February 1994) is an English professional footballer who plays for Bradford City.

Originally a centre-half, Threlkeld's versatility has also seen him play as a full-back and a defensive midfielder.

Career

Bolton Wanderers
Threkleld came through Bolton Wanderers' academy and made his debut for the team on 26 April 2014 when he started in a 3–1 away win against Sheffield Wednesday. At the end of the 2015–16 season, the club confirmed that he would be leaving when his contract expired at the end of June.

Plymouth Argyle
On 27 August 2015, Threlkeld signed on loan for Plymouth Argyle until 2 January. He made his debut for the club as an 83rd-minute substitute in a 3–2 win at AFC Wimbledon in the Football League Trophy, replacing Gregg Wylde. He scored his first career goal in a 2–1 defeat in the Devon derby against Exeter City on 21 November 2015. Threlkeld's loan expired in January 2016, but was promptly extended until the end of the regular season. The terms of his loan meant he was unable to play for Argyle in the play-offs that season.

Threlkeld was released by Bolton and on 2 July 2016 he was signed on a permanent deal by Argyle. That season, Argyle won promotion from the EFL League Two as runners-up, with Threlkeld scoring two goals: in a 2–1 defeat away to Morecambe, and in a 2–0 win at home to Crawley Town.

In the 17-18 season Threlkeld made 26 appearances as Argyle missed out on the League One play-offs by three points.

Waasland-Beveren
He was offered a new contract by Plymouth Argyle at the end of the 2017–18 season, but he chose to reject the offer and sign a three-year deal with Belgian First Division A side Waasland-Beveren.

Threlkeld made his debut for Beveren on 3 August 2018 in a 0–0 draw with Standard Liège, where he received a booking in the 90+3rd minute.

Return to Argyle
On 8 January 2019, Threlkeld rejoined Plymouth Argyle on a temporary deal until the end of the season, with him set to return to Beveren once the season had ended.

Salford City
He joined Salford City on 3 June 2019 on a two-year contract. He scored his first goal for Salford when he scored in an EFL Trophy tie against Tranmere Rovers on 12 November 2019. At the end of the 2020–21 season, it was announced that he would be leaving the club..

Bradford City
On 20 June 2021, Threlkeld agreed to join Bradford City upon the expiration of his Salford contract, officially joining the club on 1 July 2021.

He moved on loan to Oldham Athletic in August 2022.

Career statistics

Honours
Plymouth Argyle
EFL League Two runner-up: 2016–17

Salford City
EFL Trophy: 2019–20

References

External links

1994 births
Living people
English footballers
English expatriate footballers
Footballers from Bolton
Bolton Wanderers F.C. players
Plymouth Argyle F.C. players
S.K. Beveren players
English Football League players
Belgian Pro League players
Expatriate footballers in Belgium
Association football defenders
Association football midfielders
English expatriates in Belgium
Salford City F.C. players
Bradford City A.F.C. players
Oldham Athletic A.F.C. players